Barkhaa is a Bollywood Romantic film, directed by Shadaab Mirza and produced by Shabana Hashmi. It stars Sara Loren in the lead role. The film also stars Taaha Shah, Shweta Pandit, Priyanshu Chatterjee and Puneet Issar as supporting cast. The film was well known for the song "Tu Itni Khoobsurat Hai". The film was extensively shot in Himachal Pradesh, India. Marketing of the film was done by Hash Entertainment and is distributed under the banner of Zahara Productions. It was released on 27 March 2015.

Cast 
Taaha Shah as Jatin Sabarwal
Sara Loren as Barkhaa Sabarwal / Panchi, Jatin’s lover and Aakash’s ex - wife
Priyanshu Chatterjee as Aakash Sabarwal, Jatin's brother and Barkhaa’s ex - husband 
Shweta Pandit as Madhu, Barkhaa’s friend
Puneet Issar as Advocate Sabarwal, Jatin and Aakash's father
Ashiesh Roy as Mr. Shetty/Anna
Sonam Sharma as Swati
Raashul Tandon as Gullu

Production
Shooting started in Himachal Pradesh in 2014. Other filming locations include Mumbai.

Soundtracks
The music composed by Amjad-Nadeem while lyrics penned by Shadab Akhtar, Sameer. The album was named Best Hindi Album of March 2015 by Deccan Music The Soundtrack for this Album was Released on 24 March 2015.

Critical reception

References

External links
 

2015 films
2010s Hindi-language films
Indian romantic drama films
2015 romantic drama films